Gerrit Rudolph may refer to:
Gerrit Jacobus Rudolph, South African politician
Gerrit Rudolph (cricketer) (born 1988), Namibian cricketer